Zotung (Zobya) is a language spoken by the Zotung people, in Rezua Township, Chin State, Burma. It is a continuum of closely related dialects and accents. The language does not have a standard written form since it has dialects with multiple variations on its pronunciations. Instead, Zotung speakers use a widely accepted alphabet for writing with which they spell using their respective dialect. However, formal documents are written using the Lungngo dialect because it was the tongue of the first person to prescribe a standard writing, Sir Siabawi Khuamin.

Phonology

Zoccaw or Zo alphabet 
Aa AWaw Bb Cc Dd Ee Ff Gg Hh Ii Jj Kk Ll Mm Nn Oo Pp Rr Ss Tt Uu Vv Yy Zz

Vowels 
A AW E I O U Y

-a /a/~ weak form /ɔː/~/aʊː/

-aw /ɔː/~/auː/

-e /eː/~/ɛ/~ weak form /œ/

-i /iː/ weak form /ɨ/

-o /o/~/oʊː/~ weak form /ə/

-u /uː/~ weak form /ʊ/

-y /ɪ/~/ɨː/~/ʏː/

Diphthongs and triphthongs:

-ae /æ/~/ɛː/

-ai /aiː/~ weak form /æ/

-au /aʊː/~weak form /oʊ/

-awi /ɔiː/~/oɪ/~/ʏi/

-awe /ʊeː/~/øː/~/œː/

-ei /eɪ/~/e/~/eiː/

-eu /eʊː/~ weak form /œ/

-ia /iːɑ/~/iɑ/~ weak forms /ja/~/jɛ/

-oi /ɔiː/~/oiː/~/ʏː/

-ou /ə/~/œː/~/ʌː/

-ua /uaː/~weak forms /ʋa/~/uə/

-ue /ueː/~/ʋe/

-ui /uiː/~/iː/~/ʏː/

Etymologically, the long vowel counterparts of /aː/, /eː/, /iː/, /oː/, /ɔː/, and /uː/ have mutated or shifted towards several new vowels. Zotung vowels such as /æː/, /ɔː/, /aʊː/, /ɛiː/ and /œː/ correspond to a single vowel /aː/ or /ɒː/ in more conservative Kuki-Chin languages. For instance, where Mizo and Laizo have mál /ˈmaːl./, râlkap /ˈraːlkap/, nâsa /ˈnaːʂaː/, pakhat /paˈkʰaːt/, and sazûk /saˈzuːk/, the correspondents in Zotung would be mæl /ˈmæːl/, rolkaw /ˈrɔːlko/, náwsaw /ˈnaʊːʂɔ/, can-kheit /ˈθaːn χɛiːt./, and sazúk /sœˈzuːk/

Consonants 
B, C*, D, F, G, H*, J, K, L, M, N, P, R, S*, T*, V, Z*

C before a, aw, o, u, and y is pronounced like a dental fricative /θ/~/ð/. C and s are palatalized before e and i resulting in words like ciate /ˈtsʲaːte/ and seryn (ʃɛˈɾœn). H is not pronounced in some dialects in certain words, for example: mango thæhai /tʲæˈʔæː/. T is rhotacized in some dialects that results in words like khate /ˈkʰatɛ/ and tukiaccu /tˠuˈkʲeðu/ being pronounced /kʰaˈɾɛ/ and /təˈkeirʊ/. Z has a very wide pronunciation range. It can be pronounced like the voiced fricative /ʒ/ /z/ /j/ or the English /dʒ/.

Digraphs: ch, kh, ph, hr, rh, th

Ch- is seldom used in native words other than family or clan names. Ch- evolved from the palatalized soft t that preceded the vowels e and i. For example, chihno “death” was originally thihna or thihnak. Kh- in formal speech is a palatalized k sound. However, it is pronounced as /x/~/χ/ in informal speech. Hr- is a rare digraph representing /r̥/. It has evolved into /ɦ/ or /ʀ/ in some dialects. Rh- is not used in the vernacular writing.

Zotung is rich with consonant clusters that have etymologically remained the same, but they are written with schwas or other vowels to make a disyllable.

They are found in native words such as tynkrin (firmly), cintling, ablyn (all), sparo as well as in loan words like Biathlam (Revelation), Kris (Christ), naiklab (nightclub), Griekram (Greece) and Bethlem (Bethlehem).

Consonants 
Zotung has the following consonants, with the first symbol being its orthographical form and the second one its representation in the IPA:

 The glottal and glottalised consonants appear only in final position.

Distribution
In 2009 VanBik lists the following Zotung villages: Aika, Lotaw, Lovaw, Ccangho, Pangva, Ramcci, Sihanthung, Zawngnak, Angraw, Polei, Vuakkhipaw, Lavoikum, Darcung, Khawboi, Setlai, Lungkhin, Leipi, Calthawng, Langly, Sensi, Khawtua, Tuinia, Rovaw, Rezua, Ccawtui, Ransae, Etang, Thandya, Tuibyn, Hrinthang, Siangaw, Lungthlialia, Thawlang, Hunglei, Raso, Tuilaw, Tingsi, Zesaw, Thesi, Lungring, Sungpi, Votui, Kailung, Belae, Lungngo, Sempi, Tuphae, Lungdua, Suiton, Daidin, Din, Voiru, Narbung.

In 2017 there were 55 villages in 61 locations:
4 villages in Gangaw township, Magway Region;
3 villages in Hakha township, Chin State;
1 village in Thantlang township, Chin State;
1 village in Mindat township, Chin State;
46 villages in Matupi township, Chin State.
Lost Zotung villages:
Lawngko, nearby (very close with) Kailung;
Tuitaw, between Lotaw and Lungngo;
Tongbu, moved into Mara land and became Mara.

Grammar
Zotung grammar (Zotung: byazeirnázia) is the study of the morphology and syntax of Zotung, a Kuki-Chin language spoken in the Indian subcontinent and Southeast Asia. Zotung is an agglutinative language with some elements of fusionality. It is becoming more innovative in that fusional elements have increased. Its synthetic nature allows for free word order, although the dominant arrangement is subject-object-verb (SOV). There are definite articles and a morphological indefinite article depending on the source. Subject pronouns and object pronouns are often dropped due to its polypersonal agreements found in the plural conjugation of verbs.

Syntax

The primary word order is SOV however, almost all nouns undergo declension resulting in a fairly free word order. One can say “Kae beikinnka hlaw kasak” literally “I in church song I sing”. But it can also be said as “Kae kasak hlaw beikinnka” literally “I sing song in church” without losing its original meaning. Sentences in Zotung can be formed in many different constructions, the most common being dative constructions. This construction uses the dative case of nominals and pronominals. Dative constructions can occur with almost all verbs. An example is giving below:

Kae θu kakía/Kae kakía nynn ("I am cold")
Ynkía (literally means, "cold is to/on me")

The first example implicates that the speaker has a cold personality or a body that is cold all around, rather than feeling physically cold. The subject on the first sentence is in the nominative case. The second sentence uses a dative polypersonal conjugation without the transient copula verb thuavo. This construction is always used to mean one feels physically. It is still a productive construction that can be used with almost all verbs. Its use is a bit different in set proverbs like namo nih kezym  ("I trust in you", lit. "to you I have my belief").

Nouns

Gender

Some nouns have gender; however, nouns with gender are usually sex specific nouns such as animals or natural landscapes like hills, caves or species of organisms. Most of these nouns have endings like -nung, -pi, -paw, -ly that tell if they are feminine or masculine such as Luikunung (Name of a hill), Saepaw (Elephant), Sapi (Female offspring of an animal). Agreement in gender for adjectives can be observed such as with the neuter adjective ahoy. It has two other forms namely, masculine and common gender hoivo and feminine hoino. The initial a- indicates the common or neuter gender and -p- and -n- indicate masculine and feminine gender. Animacy and inanimacy are distinguished in the various usages of certain pronouns. The third person accusative amo cannot be used with inanimate nouns so therefore the pronoun is dropped and the clitic a- conjugation is used for both the nominative and accusative cases. This is also true to some extent for the second person personal pronouns. The animate determiner pronoun hom- cannot be used for inanimate nouns. Pawmou, ymmo and vavoma are used with inanimate nouns instead.

Initial a-

The initial a- is found in some nouns: arak (ale), amyn (scent), arran (branch), askare (wing). It is used on a very limited number of nouns that are inanimate and cannot stand alone without the prefix. When it is used with a noun that can stand alone, it denotes the genitive case and shows belonging of the object to a person as in arru (its bone), amitàe (its eyes), alemæ (its tail). The prefix can also be used to show definiteness in a very limited amount of nouns as in:

The prefix is also used to form the adjectival form of verbs as in below

Athín leitetu umkukholeilango

It is also used with verbs to form the adjectival form:

 khyapaw (to be bitter), akhak (bitter)
 niapaw (drink), anian (oily)
 thopaw (to be fatty), atho 
 (fat/fatty)

Vowel harmony

To some extent, Zotung uses vowel harmony when endings are attached to words. An example is one of the most common ending in the language -traw, a diminutive/comparative ending. When a word with closed and/or mid vowel uses the ending -traw, it changes to -tri as in imonuntro (newborn girl) and syntri (a little while). Some limited amount of nouns with a closed vowel change to a more open vowel. An example is the word for ape zawngpo/ zongpaw which changes to zuapo/zuapaw in some dialects retaining the difference. Another example is vo/vaw meaning a stream. When the augmentative ending -pii is added, the root changes to va resulting in vapii, river.

Verbs
Zotung verbs are heavily inflected and are highly irregular with many exceptions. They consist of a stem or base and various conjugation endings indicating person, tense, aspect, mood, and more. One way for fusional inflection in verbs is through a process known as stem alternation (Zotung: Rulenná). Each verb has at least two stems, formally named stem I, stem II, and so on. Each stem differs from each other by apophony, their vowel length, consonant voicing or devoicing, adding a consonant or entirely changing the lexicon. Since there has not been extensive research done in Zotung, verbs have yet to be grouped into conjugation classes.

Stem alternation

Like the other Kuki-Chin languages, Zotung utilizes apophony as a grammatical inflection. It is used for various purposes such as noun v. verb distinction, grammatical moods etc. The most common type of apophony is the Kuki-Chin specific vowel stem alternation where the stem vowel of a verb changes to inflect its mode. These alternations are grouped into Form I, Form II, Form III and so on. However, there is not a universally accepted way of categorizing them. An example of vowel stem alternation is given below for the verbs niapaw, to drink, chiapo, to kill, bepo, to greet.

An example of a clause using Forms I, II, and III is given below for the verb niapaw, to drink.

Form I: Arak na nialanze, nah lubok yngaeseici.  If you keep drinking ale, your brain shall rot.

Form II: Arakkha na nevelan khy.                                     You shall not be drinking ale anymore.

Form III: Arakkho na neklei khy em?                               You have not drunken any ale, [right]?

Negation

Negation usually follows the verb. There are many words to denote negation, the most common being lei, khy, nan, and lou. Lei is an auxiliary adverb that is commonly used as a compound negator, similar to the French pas. Khy is a simple negator used in declarative sentences such as khocci khy meaning “it is not cold”. Nan is used as an imperative negator such as in innlae pae nan meaning “do not go out”. Lou is used as an auxiliary as in khuara lou khy meaning “It has not rain”. Additionally, some determiner pronouns in the Lungngo and Calthawng dialects have a negative form leading to some instances of double negation. An example is the word for what, in its lemma form is pawmou in the standard language, ymmo in the northern dialects, and vavoma in the Rezua dialect, in their negative forms pawmak and ymma while it isn’t present in Rezua Zotung. This is due to a series of vowel mergers and simplification of grammar in regions with more trade and contact.

Noun derivation

There are many endings attached to words to convey a slightly modified meaning. They may also be realized as grammatical cases. The most common are -no, -zia, -po and -tu. “-no” is used to nominalize verbs while “-zia” is for adjectives and occasionally nouns. “-po” could be a masculine ending or an infinitive ending. When -po is an infinitive ending, the word is stressed at the last syllable. “-tu” is used to modify verbs to become a noun in the accusative case. For example,

 riapo(v. to read) – rianaw (n. reading as in scripture)
 hmuipo (v. to see) – muihnaw (n. sight, vision)
 sei (v. to sin) – seino (n. sin)
 umtu (n. an attitude) - umtuzia (n. desired attitudes)
 phuapo/phan (v. to compose) - phuatu/phantu (n. composer)

Cases
All nouns in Zotung inflect for cases. They can be inflected for the nominative, accusative, instrumental, dative, genitive, vocative, and various forms of the locative such as the inessive, intrative, adessive. The nominative case differs from dialect to dialect based on vowel harmony of the dialect’s differing vowels. Most nouns’ unmarked, lemma form are in the accusative form. The accusative can be further divided into a separate case depending on if the definite article -kha is counted as a case suffix, the definite accusative.  The instrumental case can also be used to show the extent of a period of time. It is inflected for in some prepositions and postpositions such as ciate (extent of time), ryte (with), liare (by). The dative has become more common and is taking over the role of the locative in younger speech. The genitive is not required when a noun acts as an adjective, but it still is sometimes used even in the adjectival form.

An example of the cases in use is:

Some case endings of proper nouns and common nouns are differentiated especially in the dative and locative cases. In the dative case, proper nouns take the -lan or -lam suffix and change according to the rules of vowel gradation. For example, the village name Thesi would become Thesilam for its dative case while Siangaw would become Siangalan.

Additionally, there are other inconsistencies in how nouns are inflected. These mismatches could be further grouped into noun classes, if Zotung has any. For instance, nouns ending in -á, -aw, or -o have an irregular declension.

Some nominals have no separate ending in the nominative and dative cases. This group is mostly made up of nouns ending in -am and -an.

Agreement

There are two prominent numbers in Zotung, singular and plural. Each of the cases have a somewhat specific plural suffix. The usual plural suffixes for the accusative in colloquial dialects are -ae, -hae, -e, and -æ. The matter of which to use depends on the previous consonant, stem vowel and speaker’s preference. Most adjectives that describe a noun are also required to agree in number, and occasionally gender and case. Therefore, in the phrase below where the word meaning royalties, boinungeklan, is a feminine noun in the dative plural case, the adjective amoivaw must also be in the feminine dative plural:

amoinune boinungeklan = to the beautiful princesses

While agreement in gender for masculine, common and neuter nouns are optional, agreement in the feminine is explicitly required.

Some nouns are naturally plural so they do not require the regular plural suffixes. Such nouns are: zapii (crowd of people), mipi (people), ablyn (all that are present), loramsa (farm animals) etc.

Question clauses

Questions are formed with both intonation and particles. Intonation varies from dialect to dialect and person to person. Question particles also vary from dialect to dialect. The formal standard language based on the Lungngo dialect uses the question particles i, ho, khawp, tou, and mou. The particles tou and mou have different forms in different contexts. Tou is derived from ta but tou has become more dominant and ta has become a form of tou. In all, tou has four forms: tou, ta, tawh, and tan. It is used in yes/no questions. Mou is derived from mah, similar to the case with tou. Mou also has four forms: mou, mah, maw, man. It is used in simple questions together with the noun like in Pawcikumou nah hminkha? (What is (question particle) your name)

Pronouns
In Zotung, there are separate pronouns for the nominative, accusative, dative and genitive cases that do not reflect the usual declension found in nouns. Examples in the nominative and dative are given below:

Pronouns in the dative are marked for both the subject and direct object, also known as polypersonalism. The proclitics are used with different conjugations to achieve clarity.

Conjugation

All verbs in Zotung have two or more forms. The different forms are used for different moods and the amount that is completing the action. Most verbs are only inflected in the plural. Dual number is only realized when the verb is conjugated since there are not separate dual pronouns. Some verbs that are inflected in the singular change stress. However, they aren’t shown in the orthography. An example of a regular verb conjugation in the indicative mood is given below.

Tense and aspect

Tense in Zotung is similar to other Kuki-Chin languages. Verbs are inflected for in the past and future tenses. The present tense is usually either in the lemma (not infinitive) form or are used with auxiliary verbs and time descriptive words. The continuous present tense can also be shown by suffixing. Regular verbs are inflected like the following:

Verbs in Zotung have around two to three infinitives and two gerunds that can be inflected for aspect and voice. The first infinitive is the one found in dictionary entries. It is formed using the stem II form of verbs plus the endings -o, -aw, or -á. This infinitive form is present in all dialects where the gerund form is used synonymously to the English -ing gerund. The second infinitive is also formed using the stem II form plus the ending -an. It can also function as a gerund and is used almost synonymously to the English to-infinitive. However, its use has been diminishing in northern dialects where it is being replaced with the future form of verbs. In dialects where both the future form and second infinitive are used, the future form is created using the stem I form plus the variable endings -no or -go. The third infinitive is formed using stem I forms of verbs with the ending -an. It is synonymous to the English bare infinitive.

References

Shintani Tadahiko. 2015. The Zotung language. Linguistic survey of Tay cultural area (LSTCA) no. 105. Tokyo: Research Institute for Languages and Cultures of Asia and Africa (ILCAA).

Kuki-Chin languages
Languages of Myanmar